In France, a Prefecture of Police , headed by the Prefect of Police (Préfet de police), is an agency of the Government of France under the administration of the Ministry of the Interior. Part of the National Police, it provides a police force for an area limited by department borders. As of 2012, two such prefectures exist:

 The Paris Police Prefecture, created in 1800
 The Bouches-du-Rhône Police Prefecture, created in 2012

See also
 Prefectures in France

References

National Police (France)